This is a list of adult nonfiction books that topped The New York Times Nonfiction Best Seller list in 1980.

See also

 1980 in literature
 The New York Times Fiction Best Sellers of 1980
 Lists of The New York Times Nonfiction Best Sellers
 Publishers Weekly list of bestselling novels in the United States in the 1980s

References

1980
.
1980 in the United States